The Landfall 43 is a Canadian sailboat that was designed by Robert W. Ball, the chief designer of C&C Design, and first built in 1982. The Landfall 43 was built with the charter trade in mind, to compete with Morgan and Whitby’s centre cockpit models. The Landfall series, begun with the Landfall 43's predecessor the Landfall 42, was part of a trend within C&C Yachts during the later 1970s and early 1980s to develop more cruising-oriented designs under company president George Cuthbertson's direction.

Production
The design was built by the Canadian company C&C Yachts starting in 1982, but it is now out of production.

Design
The Landfall 43 is a recreational keelboat, built predominantly of fibreglass, with wood trim. It has a masthead sloop rig or optionally a ketch rig, a centre cockpit, a raked stem, raised transom, a skeg-mounted rudder controlled by a wheel and a fixed fin keel. It displaces  and carries  of ballast.

Accommodations
Access to the aft cabin is through a companionway from the cockpit, or through an interior passageway with full standing headroom. The aft cabin is large, with a centre line double berth, a hanging locker plus other lockers, and private head with shower. There are four opening ports and an opening hatch for light and ventilation. The passageway forward has a workbench outboard (or optionally two sea berths) and engine access inboard.

Entering the saloon, the galley is to port, and the navigation station is just ahead. The large U-shaped galley has a refrigerator, double stainless steel sinks, a row of drawers, a hidden built-in disposal basket, a dry locker, and a three-burner propane stove with oven.

The saloon's U-shaped dinette converts to a double berth, with a settee across. There are six lockers behind the settees. Forward is a head, accessible from either the saloon or the forecabin. The forward cabin is a double and provides lockers, hanging lockers, and other storage. There are six opening ports, five opening hatches, and two dorade boxes forward for ventilation.

See also

 List of sailing boat types

References

External links
Original C&C factory brochure for the Landfall 43 with Sail Plan and Accommodations Layout
Landfall 43 Standard Equipment List

Keelboats
1980s sailboat type designs
Sailing yachts
Sailboat type designs by Robert W. Ball
Sailboat types built by C&C Yachts